Agrococcus citreus is a bacterium from the genus Agrococcus which has been isolated from a wall painting from the chapel of Herberstein in Styria.

References

Microbacteriaceae
Bacteria described in 1999